Steve Lamont "Junior" Robinson jr (born February 15, 1996)  is an American basketball player  for Kipinä Basket of the 1st Division B. He played college basketball for Mount St. Mary's. He was born in Mebane, North Carolina.

College career
Robinson, a 5'5 guard, attended Eastern Alamance High School and scored 2,228 points in his career, 17th in North Carolina high school history. Despite being one of the shortest players in college basketball, he averaged 8.2 points per game as a freshman and was named to the NEC all-rookie team. He scored 12.6 points per game and was named to the Second Team All-Northeast Conference as a sophomore.

As a junior, Robinson averaged 14.1 points per game and led Mount St. Mary's to the NCAA tournament as a 16 seed. He scored 23 points on 9-for-14 shooting in the First Four win against New Orleans. Robinson repeated on the Second Team All-Northeast Conference that year. As a senior, Robinson averaged 22.0 points and 4.8 assists per game and led the Mountaineers to a second-place finish in conference play. He earned five Northeast Conference Player of the Week mentions. At the conclusion of the regular season he was named NEC Player of the year, the second Mount St. Mary's player to be so honored.

Professional career
After going undrafted in the 2018 NBA draft, Robinson signed with the Atlanta Hawks for NBA Summer League. On August 22, 2018, Robinson signed with Sáenz Horeca Araberri of the LEB Oro. In his professional debut on October 6, he scored 47 points against Melilla, the second-most points in a single game in league history.

After missing the beginning of the season with a knee injury, Robinson signed with CD Estela of the LEB Plata. In the end of 2020 he signed for Kipinä Basket for the rest of the season 2020-2021.

References

External links
Mount St. Mary's Mountaineers bio
Junior Robinson, el pequeño gigante que firmó un gran debut (Por Pablo Romero en FEB.es)

1996 births
Living people
African-American basketball players
American expatriate basketball people in Spain
American men's basketball players
Araberri BC players
Basketball players from North Carolina
Mount St. Mary's Mountaineers men's basketball players
People from Mebane, North Carolina
Point guards
21st-century African-American sportspeople